Caro is a given name that is an alternate spelling of Carol and a short form of Caroline. Notable people with the name include:

caro♡ (born 1990), French musician
Caro Crawford Brown (1908–2001) American journalist
Caro Cult (born 1994), German actress
Caro Dahl (1890–1979), Norwegian tennis player
Caro Dawes (1866–1957), Second Lady of the United States
Caro Emerald (born 1981), Dutch pop and jazz singer
Caro Feely (born 1968)  South African winemaker
Caro Fraser (1953–2020), British novelist
Caro Jones (1923–2009), Canadian-American actress and casting director 
Caro Llewellyn (born 1965), Australian festival director and writer 
Caro Lucas (1949–2010), Iranian-Armenian scientist
Caro Benigno Massalongo (1852–1928), Italian botanist
Caro Meldrum-Hanna, Australian journalist
Caro Newling (born 1957), English theatre producer
Caro Niederer (born 1963), Swiss artist
Caro Ramsay, Scottish writer 
Caro Roma (1866–1937), American singer and composer
Caro Soles, Canadian author

See also

Caro (surname)
Caroline (name)
Charo (name)

Notes